Sara Trentini (born 24 June 1991 in Riva Del Garda, Italy), is an Italian Women's International motorcycle trials rider. Trentini is a 5 times  Italian Women's Trials Champion, winning the National title in 2010 thru 2012, and again in 2016 and 2017.

Biography
Trentini first competed in the Italian Women's Trials Championship in 2006, finishing in 5th place. 2007 she repeated the finish of 5th and in 2008 finished a creditable 3rd place in the championship behind champion Martina Balducchi and Michela Bonnin. Trentini competed on the international circuit during 2008 as a member of the Italian Women's Trial Des Nations team in Andorra alongside Balducchi and Bonnin. She also competed in the European Championships, placing 18th.

2009 Trentini was once again a member of the Italian TDN team, and finished runner-up in the Italian Championship, once more behind Martina Balducchi. She took charge of the 2010 championship taking her first Italian title ahead of TDN teammate Balducchi. A step up into the FIM Women's World Championship produced a 15th-place finished at the end of the season, with a best finish of 12th in Poland.

The Italian title was successfully defended in 2011, once more ahead of Balducchi after the title race went down to the last round at Lazzate. The pair started the final round even on points, Trentini took the win and with it the title. In 2012 Trentini made it three titles in a row, though had to give up second best to Balducchi in 2013. The World Championships proved more fruitful for Trentini after finishing in 8th place, her best finish to date.

2015 saw Trentini finish an excellent 2nd place in the FIM Trial European Championship behind German rider Theresa Bauml, after winning the opening round held in Italy. She topped off the season with runner-up spot in the Italian championships.

National Trials Championship Career

International Trials Championship Career

Honors
 Italian Women's Trials Champion 2010, 2011, 2012, 2016, 2017

Related Reading
FIM Trial European Championship
FIM Trial World Championship

References 

1991 births
Living people
People from Riva del Garda
Italian sportswomen
Italian motorcycle racers
Motorcycle trials riders
Female motorcycle racers
Sportspeople from Trentino